The 13th Robert Awards ceremony was held in 1996 in Copenhagen, Denmark. Organized by the Danish Film Academy, the awards honoured the best in Danish and foreign film of 1995.

Honorees

Best Danish Film 
  – Carsten Rudolph

Best Screenplay 
 Carsten Rudolph –

Best Actor in a Leading Role 
 Ulf Pilgaard –

Best Actress in a Leading Role 
 Puk Scharbau –

Best Actor in a Supporting Role 
 Søren Pilmark –

Best Actress in a Supporting Role 
 Birthe Neumann –

Best Cinematography 
 Anthony Dod Mantle –

Production Design 
 Viggo Bentzon –

Best Costume Design 
 Manon Rasmussen –

Best Makeup 
 Elisabeth Bukkehave –

Best Sound Design 
 Hans Møller –

Best Editing 
 Morten Giese –

Best Score 
 Anders Koppel –

Best Documentary Short 
 Carl Th. Dreyer: My Metier by Torben Skjødt Jensen & Haiti, Untitled by Jørgen Leth

Best Foreign Film 
 Smoke – Wayne Wang

See also 

 1996 Bodil Awards

References

External links 
  

1995 film awards
1996 in Denmark
Robert Awards ceremonies
1990s in Copenhagen